The 4th Airborne Corps  was an airborne corps of the Red Army in World War II. It fought in the Vyazma airborne operation, an unsuccessful landing during the Rzhev-Vyazma Offensive.

History 
The corps was formed in the spring of 1941 in the Western Special Military District from the personnel of the 214th Airborne Brigade. The corps was commanded by Aleksey Semenovich Zhadov. On 22 June 1941, the corps was stationed in the Western Front's second echelon in Pukhavichy in Minsk Region. On 26 June, the corps was ordered to conduct an air-assault and ground attack with the 20th Mechanized Corps to stop advancing German troops at Slutsk. The corps did not have transport aircraft and instead attacked on foot. The counterattack failed and both corps were broken through.

In late June, the 214th Airborne Brigade was redeployed by truck to the area of the road at Glusk to operate in the rear of advancing German troops at Babruysk.

The main forces of the corps, the 7th and 8th Airborne Brigades, went into action at the beginning of July 1941 at the bend of the Berezina River in the area of the Berezina and the Svisloch River, and then retreated to the east in the area of Mahilyow. On and after 8 July, the transports of the 409th Rifle Regiment and the remainder of the 624th Rifle Regiment, part of the 137th Rifle Division, were separated from the forward elements of the division. They were still approaching Krichev and later joined the 7th Airborne Brigade. The brigades were taken out of line for refitting in the rear on 10 July.

The renewed German offensive forced the 4th Airborne Corps (7th and 8th Airborne Brigades) to engage in combat at Krichev on 16 July 1941. On July 17 the enemy captured Krichev, and on the night of July 18 secured it completely, crossed the Sozh River and seized a bridgehead. On 19 July the 4th Airborne Corps tried to restore the situation at Krichev. Its operational detachment attacked the city on 29 July but was destroyed on the next day. This led to the German reoccupation of Krichev.

In August 1941, as a result of a new attack of the enemy the corps was surrounded, and attempted to break out in the region of Unecha, Pogar, Starodub, and some personnel also made their way out of the encirclement in the area of Trubchevsk. In September 1941, the corps was sent to be reformed beyond the Volga River in Povolzhye. In December 1941, after training, it was relocated to the Kaluga area, now composed of the 8th, 9th and 214th airborne brigades.

On 15 December 1941, to the west of Klin one battalion of the 214th Airborne Brigade (415 personnel) was paradropped to cut the only road at Teryaevo Sloboda and prevent a German retreat to Volokolamsk.

It was decided to airdrop the corps at Ozerechnya village 35 km southwest of Vyazma on 15 January 1942. The 8th Airborne Brigade was airlifted, however, due to the overall change in the situation, it was not considered necessary to drop the entire corps, and the remainder of the corps was withdrawn to its original position at Lyubertsy.

During the Rzhev-Vyazma operation in 1942, from 18 to 23 February, the corps was dropped behind German lines in the Yukhnov direction 25 kilometers south of Vyazma in the Vyazma airborne operation. 7,373 parachutists and 1,524 bales with ammunition and equipment were dropped. In March 1942, the corps occupied the area of Kluchy, Tynovka, Yurkino, Petrishchevo, Novaya, and Verterhovo station. On the 18 March 1942, in heavy defensive fighting the corps was practically split in two. On 11 April 1942 the corps was subordinated to the 1st Guards Cavalry Corps. The corps operated behind enemy lines in total isolation from the main forces until June 1942, when ordered to break out of the encirclement, which was achieved on 28 June 1942.

In August 1942, the corps was re-formed as the 38th Guards Rifle Division.

In the second half of 1942, the corps was formed again, but was not involved in the fighting, and in December 1942 was used to form the 1st Guards Airborne Division.

Subordination 

 Western Front, front-line submission - on 01/07/1941 (except for the 214th Airborne Brigade)
 Western Front, 13th Army - from the beginning of July 1941
 Volga Military District, the formation, on 01.10.1941
 Stavka reserve - on 01.01.1942
 Moscow Military District - on 01.04.1942

Composition 

214th Airborne Brigade - The brigade was formed in 1938 in the city of Marina Gorka on the basis of the 47th Special Purpose Airborne Brigade. It participated in the Soviet invasion of Poland, The Winter War and the Soviet occupation of Bessarabia and Northern Bukovina. After  Operation Barbarossa, it mostly fought in isolation from the main forces. On 28 June 1941, it was attached to the 210th Motorized Division. The brigade was tasked to conduct a motorized raid in the German rear at Staryya Darohi  and Glusk. The raid was successful but the brigade was surrounded because of the retreat of the 210th Motorized Division. It was surrounded for two months. In late August, the brigade broke out and joined the 21st Army. It concentrated on the southwestern outskirts of Mena on 28 August. It defended the south bank of the Desna River at Butovka station on 5 September. After being replaced in the line, the brigade was located at the reserve army headquartered in Shapovalovki. In December, a battalion of the brigade was airdropped and remained behind German lines for 9 days. The battalion reportedly blew up 29 bridges, burned 48 tankers, knocked out 2 tanks and killed at least 400 German soldiers. The battalion allegedly forced the Germans to abandon heavy weapons.
7th Airborne Brigade - The brigade was formed in the spring of 1941 from the line units of the 201st Rifle Division. On 1 July it was transferred to defend the crossings over the Berezina River at Berezino. It arrived on 3 July, but was pushed back from the shore and could not recapture the German brigade. As a result, it was forced to retreat in the direction of the corps. During the reformation it joined the 5th Airborne Corps.
8th Airborne Brigade - The brigade was formed in the spring of 1941 from the line units of 231st Rifle Division. It was moved to the line of the Svichloch River on 30 June and fought the Germans in small groups. It retreated in the direction of the corps. In the period from 27 January 1942 to 1 February 1942, 2,081 paratroopers out of 3,062 in the brigade, 120 light machine guns, 72 antitank guns, 20 82mm mortars and 30 other mortars were dropped behind German lines in the area of Ozerechnya. 76 paratroopers from the 214th Airborne Brigade were also airdropped. However, the drop was not accurate and paratroopers were dispersed on the ground. By 1 February, the rallying point at Androsov was reached by only 746 paratroopers. The rest were either killed, captured or had joined the partisans.  For the next seven days, the brigade fought a series of battles and on 7 February linked up with the 41st Cavalry Division and was subordinated to that unit on 12 February. It returned to the control of the 4th Airborne Corps on 7 April.
9th Airborne Brigade - The brigade was formed in the spring of 1941 from the 203rd Rifle Division and was part of the 5th Airborne Corps but after reorganization became part of the 4th Airborne Corps instead of the 7th Airborne Brigade.

Commanders 
Source:
 Colonel Aleksandr Fyodorovich Kazankin (May - June 1941)
 Major General Aleksei Semyonovich Zhadov (June - August 1941)
 Colonel Aleksandr Fedorovich Kazankin  (August - November 1941)
 Major General Aleksei Fyodorovich Levashev (November 1941 - February 1942) (died while in a transport aircraft attacked by German fighters)
 Major General Aleksandr Fedorovich Kazankin (February - August 1942)

References

Bibliography 
 
 Справочник на сайте клуба "Память" Воронежского госуниверситета
 Участие ВДВ в Великой Отечественной войне 1941-1945 гг.
 Дорогами воздушного десанта
 Белорусские хроники, 1941 год. На южном фланге Западного фронта
 Советские воздушно-десантные. Военно-исторический очерк. — Moscow : Voenizdat, 1986, 2-е изд.
 Свердлов Ф. Д., 4-й воздушно-десантный корпус, Moscow, Монолит, 2002

Corps of the Soviet Airborne Forces
Military units and formations established in 1941
Military units and formations disestablished in 1942
Wikipedia articles needing cleanup after translation from Russian